Suryavamsam is a 1998 Indian Telugu-language drama film directed by Bhimaneni Srinivasa Rao and produced by R. B. Choudary under Super Good Films. It stars Venkatesh and Meena , with soundtrack composed by S. A. Rajkumar. The film is the Telugu remake of the Tamil film Suryavamsam (1997).

Plot
Harischandra Prasad (Venkatesh), the arbitrator and most respected person in a village, sees to it that all the people live happily. He has a strong enmity to Singaraju Lingaraju (Anand Raj) and vice versa. He is the only opponent to him in the village. Harischandra has a big family with his wife Vasundhara (Raadhika), three sons Ravi Prasad (Vinod), Divakar Prasad (Maharshi Raghava) and Bhanu Prasad (Venkatesh), a daughter Shanti, two daughters-in-law, and two granddaughters. Harischandra dislikes his third son Bhanu because of him being illiterate, but Bhanu is a devoted and benevolent son to his father. Bhanu has to do menial household work and has virtually no relationships with his family, with the exception of his mother.

Swapna (Meena) arrives for her brother's wedding to Bhanu's sister. In the beginning, she thinks Bhanu is a servant and looks down on him. After some time, she knows the fact and asks Bhanu's friend Nukaraju (Sudhakar) what actually happened. Then he reveals Bhanu's past. Bhanu's childhood love Madhavi (Sanghavi) turns him down and attempts to commit suicide to escape from being married to him, as she did not want to unite with an illiterate man. To prevent any misunderstandings, Bhanu declared that he was not interested in Madhavi and earned his father's wrath. After listening to Bhanu's story, Swapna falls in love with him. Even though Bhanu isn't interested initially, eventually he accepts her love.

Meanwhile, Singaraju makes a plan to have Swapna marry his son. Bhanu breaks his plan, marries Swapna, and enrages both of their parents. They start living in the village outskirts. An event occurs in which Madhavi insults them, so Bhanu decides to grow up and prove himself. Swapna teaches him reading, writing, and some arithmetic, while she pursues her own, I.A.S. studies. In due of time with hard work, Bhanu Prasad gradually becomes one of the biggest businessmen in town and Swapna the District Collector. They have a fine young son, Junior Harischandra Prasad (Master Anand Vardhan). At one point, Madhavi requests Bhanu to allow her husband to work in his factory, as his business is under loss.

Harischandra incidentally comes across his grandson, develops a secret friendly relation with him. Knowing this, Bhanu and Swapna also feel very happy. One day, Bhanu gives his son some canned Payasam (rice pudding) to be offered to his father. Eventually, Singaraju mixes up poison in it. Vasundhara learns of the secret meeting of Harischandra with his grandson and urges him to accept Bhanu back into their family. She praises Bhanu to be as valuable as a diamond. At the same time, Surya as Swathi's father has a serious malady apparently because of consuming the "Payasam" to Harischandra, he is hospitalized and Bhanu is suspected of making an attempt on his father's life.

At the hospital, when Singaraju and his men badly beat Bhanu, Harischandra arrives to his son's rescue. It is then when Harischandra declares that Singaraju had poisoned the "Payasam". A combat ensues between Harischandra and Singaraju until the latter confesses his guilt. Finally, Harischandra accepts Bhanu as his son, and the entire family is happily united.

Cast

 Venkatesh as Harischandra Prasad & Bhanu Prasad (Dual role)
 Meena as Swapna 
 Raadhika as Vasundhara
 Sanghavi as Madhavi (Voice dubbed by Shilpa)
 Satyanarayana as Justice Dakshana Murthy
 Anandaraj as Singaraju Lingaraju
 Kota Srinivasa Rao as Major Yeddulayya
 Sudhakar as Gudimetla Nukaraju
 Ali as Devadasu
 Mallikarjuna Rao as Dr. Neecham
 Nutan Prasad as Judge
 P. L. Narayana as Narayana
 Raja Ravindra as Venu Gopal
 Maharshi Raghava as Diwakar Prasad
 Ashok Kumar as Drama director
 Banerjee as Inspector
 Varsha
 Kallu Chidambaram
 Bandla Ganesh
 Tirupathi Prakash
 Vinod as Ravi Prasad
 Jaya Bhaskar as SP
 Prasanna Kumar as Paidibabu
 Satti Babu
 Junior Relangi
 Gadiraju Subba Rao
 Chandra Mouli
 Sathyapriya as Justice Dakshana Murthy's wife
 Sana as Ravi Prasad's wife
 Rajitha as Devakar Prasad's wife
 Annuja as Bus conductor
 Master Anand Vardhan as Junior Harichandra Prasad, Bhanu Prasad and Swapna's son

Soundtrack
Music composed by S. A. Rajkumar. Music released on ADITYA Music Company. Except for the song "Kadhala" which was replaced with a new tune "Kila Kila Navve", other songs from the original were retained. "Kila Kila Navve" would later be reused as "Thoda Thodu Enavae Vanavil" in the 1999 Tamil film Thulladha Manamum Thullum.

References

External links
 

1998 films
Telugu remakes of Tamil films
Twins in Indian films
1990s Telugu-language films
Films directed by Bhimaneni Srinivasa Rao
1998 drama films
Super Good Films films